Brij Vilash Lal , OF (21 August 1952 – 25 December 2021) was an Indo-Fijian historian who wrote about the Pacific region and the Indian indenture system.  A harsh critic of the Bainimarama government, which originated in the military coup of 2006 and retained power in the 2014 elections, he lived in exile in Australia.

Early life 

Lal was born in 1952 in Tabia, Labasa on the northern island of Vanua Levu, Fiji to illiterate parents. His paternal grandfather was a North Indian indentured sugar cane farmer in Fiji, known as a 'girmitya', - the focus of Lal's early academic research. He completed an undergraduate degree in history at the University of the South Pacific.  He went on to do an MA (1976) at the University of British Columbia and a PhD (1980) at the Australian National University.

Academic career 

Lal was professor of Pacific and Asian History at the School of Culture, History and Language at Australian National University from 1990 until his retirement in 2015, when he was appointed an Emeritus Professor.  He previously taught at the University of Hawaii at Manoa from 1983 to 1990.  He also lectured at University of the South Pacific in Suva and at the University of Papua New Guinea. He held visiting positions at the University of the South Pacific and the University of Cambridge, and served as head of the Centre for Diasporic Studies at the University of Fiji.

Among his many books are an autobiography, Mr Tulsi's Store: A Fijian Journey (2001), which was named a "Notable" book by the San Francisco-based Kiriyama Prize in 2002. He was also the author of Chalo Jahaji: On a journey through indenture in Fiji (2000) and editor of Bittersweet: The Indo-Fijian Experience (2004), the latter two recounting the history of the trials and triumphs of the Indo-Fijian community. He was the Editor of the Journal of Pacific History and the Founding Editor of the literary journal, Conversations.

Honours 

Lal was elected a fellow of the Australian Academy of the Humanities (FAHA) in 1996. On 1 January 2001 he was awarded an Australian Centenary Medal "for service to Australian society and the humanities in the study of Pacific history".

Lal was made an Officer of the Order of Fiji (OF) in 1998, following his role on the 1995 Fijian Constitution Review Committee.

Lal was made a Member of the Order of Australia (AM) in the 2015 Queen's Birthday Honours (Australia) "for significant service to education, through the preservation and teaching of Pacific history, as a scholar, author and commentator".

He was honoured by the Fiji Millennium Committee for distinguished scholarship, and was also named as one of the seventy people who helped shape Fiji's history in the 20th century.

Political engagement 

In the 1990s, Lal served as the nominee of the Leader of the opposition, Jai Ram Reddy on the three-member Constitutional Review Commission, whose work culminated in the adoption of the 1997 Constitution in 1997-1998.

Lal condemned the Military coup d'état which deposed the government of Prime Minister Laisenia Qarase on 5 December 2006. Fiji Live quoted him as saying on 7 December that the coup was not different in essence from the two coups staged by Sitiveni Rabuka in 1987, or George Speight's coup of 2000.  This time, however, race was not seen to be a factor, he said, unlike the previous occasions when ethnic issues were used, he claimed, as a scapegoat for other interests.

In November 2009, Lal discussed the ongoing political situation in Fiji after the expulsion of the Australian and New Zealand high commissioners, in an interview with Radio New Zealand.  Shortly afterwards he was taken into custody and questioned about his comments.  During the questioning, Lal reported that he was subjected to foul language and advised to leave the country within 24 hours, which he did.  Lal has subsequently clarified that he was expelled rather than being deported.

Forced exile 

In March 2015, Defence Minister Timoci Natuva announced that Lal was prohibited indefinitely from returning to Fiji because his actions were "prejudicial to the peace, defence, public safety, public order and security of Government of Fiji". This decision was reiterated in late June or early July 2015. Lal reacted angrily to the ban on his return:

Personal life and death 

Lal was married to fellow-academic Padma Lal. She too has been prohibited from returning to Fiji.  He died at his residence in Brisbane on 25 December 2021, at the age of 69.

Following the 2022 Fijian general election, the new government led by Sitiveni Rabuka revoked the prohibition order on Lal's wife, allowing her to return his ashes to Fiji.

References

Bibliography 

Brij Lal, Girmityas: The Origins of the Fiji Indians, Journal of Pacific History, Canberra, 1983
Brij Lal (ed), Politics in Fiji: studies in contemporary history, Allen & Unwin, Sydney, 1986
Brij Lal, Power and prejudice: the making of the Fiji crisis, New Zealand Institute of International Affairs, 1988
Brij Lal, Broken waves: A history of Fiji Islands in the twentieth century, University of Hawaii Press, Honolulu, 1992
Brij Lal (ed), Pacific islands history: journeys and transformations, Journal of Pacific History, Canberra, 1992
Sir Paul Reeves, Tomasi Rayalu Vakatora, and Brij Lal, The Fiji Islands: towards a united future: report of the Fiji Constitution Review Commission, Fiji Constitution Review Commission, Suva, 1996
Brij Lal, A vision for change: A.D. Pagel and the politics of Fiji, National Centre for Development Studies, Canberra, 1997
Brij Lal, Another way: the politics of constitutional reform in post-coup Fiji, Asia Pacific Press, Canberra, 1998
Brij Lal, Fiji before the storm: elections and the politics of development, Asia Pacific Press, Canberra, 2000
Brij Lal and Kate Fortune, The Pacific Islands: An Encyclopedia, University of Hawaii Press, Honolulu, 2000
Brij Lal, Mr Tulsi's store: a Fijian journey, Pandanus Books, Canberra, 2001
Brij Lal and Michael Pretes (eds.), Coup: reflections on the political crisis in Fiji, Pandanus Books, Canberra, 2001
Brij Lal, photographs by Peter Hendrie, Bittersweet: the Indo-Fijian experience, Pandanus Books, Canberra, 2004
Brij Lal (editor), The encyclopedia of the Indian diaspora, National University of Singapore, Singapore, 2006
Jon Fraenkel, Stewart Firth, and Brij Lal (eds), The 2006 military takeover in Fiji: a coup to end all coups?, ANU E Press, Canberra, 2006
Doug Munro and Brij Lal (ed.), Texts and contexts: reflections in Pacific Islands historiography, University of Hawaii Press, Honolulu, 2006
 Doug Munro and Brij Lal, "Journeys and transformations", The Ivory Tower and Beyond : Participant Historians of the Pacific, Newcastle upon Tyne, Cambridge Scholars Publishing, 2009, pp. 243–309.
Brij Lal, In the eye of the storm: Jai Ram Reddy and the politics of postcolonial Fiji, ANU E Press, Canberra, 2010
Brij Lal, Intersections: history, memory, discipline, Fiji Institute of Applied Studies, 2011
Brij Lal, Chalo Jahaji: on a journey through indenture in Fiji, ANU E Press, Canberra, 2012
Brij Lal, Turnings: Fiji factions, ANU E Press, Canberra, 2013
Brij Lal, Historical dictionary of Fiji, Rowman & Littlefield, ANU E Press, 2013
Bill Gammage, Brij Lal, and Gavan Daws (ed.), The boy from Boort: remembering Hank Nelson, ANU Press, Canberra, 2014
Brij Lal (ed.), The Coombs: a house of memories, ANU Press, Canberra, 2014
Brij Lal, Levelling Wind: Remembering Fiji, ANU Press, Acton, Australian Capital Territory, 2019

External links 
 Lal at Research School of Pacific and Asian Studies, Australian National University (2011)
 Writer biography, Perth International Arts Festival
 
 Fiji Institute of Applied Studies
 Brij Lal at Austlit, The Resource for Australian Literature
 The Contemporary Pacific 14.1 (2002) 168-184
 Bittersweet: the Indo-Fijian experience  (Lal's Chapter One: "Girmit, History, Memory")
 The University of Fiji

1952 births
2021 deaths
20th-century Fijian writers
21st-century Fijian writers
Indo-Fijian writers
People from Labasa
Fijian Hindus
University of the South Pacific alumni
Fijian historians
Historians of the Pacific
Fijian expatriates in Australia
Academic staff of the University of the South Pacific
Academic staff of the University of Fiji
University of Hawaiʻi faculty
Academic staff of the University of Papua New Guinea
Academic staff of the Australian National University
Fijian democracy activists
Fijian exiles
Members of the Order of Australia
Officers of the Order of Fiji
Recipients of the Centenary Medal
Fellows of the Australian Academy of the Humanities
University of British Columbia alumni
Australian National University alumni